Tevin Westbrook (born February 17, 1993) is an American football tight end who is currently a free agent. He played college football at Florida.

Early years
A Rivals.com three-star defensive end prospect from Florida, Westbrook helped North Broward Prep School to a 6-3 record his senior year. He chose the University of Florida over UConn, North Carolina, Purdue and USF.

College career
As a true freshman in 2011, Westbrook appeared in only three games. He moved to tight end in 2012, where he saw action in all 13 games and one start against Bowling Green, but did not record a catch all season. In 2013, he played in all 12 games with two starts, totaling three catches for 30 yards. In 2014, he played in all 12 games with two starts, totaling eight catches for 81 yards. He caught two passes for 25 yards against Kentucky and scored his first career touchdown.

Professional career

Tennessee Titans
Westbrook signed with the Tennessee Titans as an undrafted free agent on May 18, 2015. He was waived by the Titans on September 1, 2015 and was signed to the practice squad on September 5, 2015. He was released on September 22, 2015.

Tampa Bay Buccaneers
On September 30, 2015, Westbrook was signed to the Tampa Bay Buccaneers' practice squad. He was promoted to the active roster on December 30, 2015.

On August 28, 2016, Westbrook was waived by the Buccaneers. On October 17, 2016, he was re-signed to the practice squad. He signed a reserve/future contract with the Buccaneers on January 2, 2017.

On September 2, 2017, Westbrook was waived the Buccaneers.

References

External links
 Tampa Bay Buccaneers bio

1993 births
Living people
American football tight ends
People from Coconut Creek, Florida
Florida Gators football players
Tennessee Titans players
Tampa Bay Buccaneers players
Sportspeople from Broward County, Florida
Players of American football from Florida